Dephomys is a genus of rodent in the family Muridae endemic to Africa. 
It contains the following species:
 Defua rat (Dephomys defua)
 Ivory Coast rat (Dephomys eburneae)

References

 
Rodent genera
Taxa named by Oldfield Thomas
Taxonomy articles created by Polbot